The Canadian ambassador to Algeria is the official representative of the Canadian government to the government of Algeria. The official title for the ambassador is the Canadian Ambassador to Algeria with the rank and status of Ambassador Extraordinary and Plenipotentiary Permanent Representative. The current Canadian ambassador is Michael Callan who was appointed on the advice of Prime Minister Justin Trudeau on December 20, 2021.

The Embassy of Canada is located at 18 Mustapha Khalef Street, Ben Aknoun, Algiers, Algeria.

History of diplomatic relations 

Diplomatic relations between Canada and Algeria was established on July 3, 1962. Ross Campbell was appointed as Canada's first Ambassador to Yugoslavia, concurrently accredited as Ambassador to Algeria and resident in Yugoslavia on October 18, 1965. Canada's embassy was established in Yugoslavia in November 1965, and established an embassy in Algeria on November 26, 1971.

List of Canadian ambassadors to Algeria

Notes

References 

Bibliography

External Links 
 

Algeria
 
Canadian